The Ngaruroro River is located in the eastern North Island of New Zealand. About 40% of the catchment is pasture, and 55% native forest.
The meaning of Ngaruroro is obscure.

Course
The upper Ngaruroro drains the Kaweka Forest Park and it is used for trout fishing (mostly rainbow), rafting, tramping and deer hunting.

The river is mostly a single-thread channel down to Whanawhana ( from the coast), flowing through a greywacke rock gorge. Below Whanawhana, the river opens to wide braided channel and is joined by the Maraekakaho River. The Ngaruroro shares a river mouth with the Tutaekuri, Clive River and Muddy Creek. The meeting of these rivers forms the Waitangi Estuary.

Aquifer
The Ngaruroro River recharges freshwater to the Heretaunga groundwater aquifer (in the order of ). This aquifer feeds several streams in the area (e.g. Raupare, Irongate), in addition to pumping that supports extensive orchards of the Heretaunga Plains.

Flooding
The Ngaruroro is one of several rivers that helped form the alluvial Heretaunga Plains at the south end of the coast of Hawke Bay. The course of the Ngaruroro has changed several times, originally flowing down what is now the Clive River. It changed to much of its present course in 1867 during a major flood. In 1969, the bottom  of river was diverted more directly to the coast (near Pakowhai Road) in an effort to reduce flooding. The river is now contained within flood banks in these lower reaches from Fernhill, Hawke's Bay to the mouth of the river. The Karamu and Clive remain as rivers, but drain a smaller catchment.

The river breached its flood banks during Cyclone Gabrielle in February 2023, inundating a large area of the Heretaunga Plains. The settlements of Omahu, Waiohiki and Pakowhai were severely affected with dozens of homes being destroyed. Large areas of orchards and vineyards were ruined and homes in Taradale were evacuated. Bridges 216 and 217 (Waitangi Washout) on the Palmerston North–Gisborne railway line and Waitangi Park Bridge on SH51 were damaged.

References

Rivers of the Hawke's Bay Region
Rivers of New Zealand